The Minnesota State Mavericks are the intercollegiate athletic teams that represent Minnesota State University, Mankato. The school's athletic program includes 21 varsity sports teams. More than 600 students participate each year in athletics for the university. Most of the university's athletic teams compete at the NCAA Division II level in the Northern Sun Intercollegiate Conference (NSIC). The men's and women's ice hockey teams compete at the Division I level, respectively in the Central Collegiate Hockey Association (CCHA) and Western Collegiate Hockey Association (WCHA). Minnesota State began competition in the NSIC in 2008–09, due to the dissolution of the North Central Conference. It was also one of the seven WCHA men's hockey members that left that league after the 2020–21 season to reestablish the CCHA, a move that led to the demise of the men's side of the WCHA.

The university has won 6 team and 49 individual national championships. The combined teams have won the NSIC US Bank All-Sports Award 4 times. Since 1993 the Mavericks have been awarded the most National Championships out of all sixteen colleges and universities in the Northern Sun Conference. The Mavericks also participate in the Division II Learfield Sports Directors’ Cup national competition.

Sports 

The Minnesota State Mavericks athletics program fields 8 men's sports and 10 women's sports teams. The men's sports teams include baseball, basketball, cross country, football, golf, ice hockey, track and field and wrestling. The women's teams include basketball, cross country, golf, ice hockey, soccer, softball, swimming and diving, tennis, track and field, and volleyball. In addition, the athletics program includes the athletic marching band called the Maverick Machine, competitive dance and noncompetitive cheerleading.

Baseball 
The men's baseball team has had considerable success in recent years, reaching the College World Series in 2010, 2012, 2013, and 2014. The baseball team has finished the 2011–2014 seasons with average winning percentages points at 0.750 or above. Top players who helped lead the Mavericks to a second-place at the Division II Baseball World Series in 2013 in included righthanded pitcher Jason Hoppe who set the NCAA single-season record with 55 1/3 consecutive scoreless innings streak and righthanded pitcher Harvey Martin who was named national pitcher of the year by Rawlings/ABCA, Daktronics and the NCBWA and was named First Team All-American by those three organizations. Martin went 9–1 and had a 2.06 earned run average as a senior. In 2013 they finished as runners-up to the University of Tampa. The team is currently coached by Matt Magers.

Football

The Minnesota State football team plays in NCAA Division II and is a member of the Northern Sun Intercollegiate Conference.  Since 1962, they have played in Blakeslee Stadium, with a natural grass field and a capacity of 7,000.

The current head coach is Todd Hoffner, who has led Minnesota State to NCAA playoff appearances (2008, 2009, 2014, 2015, 2017, 2018 & 2019) including an appearance at the NCAA National Championship game in 2014 and 2019. 

Minnesota State alumni who have gone on to the NFL include wide receiver Adam Thielen, offensive lineman Chris Reed, and tight end Bob Bruer.

Men's basketball
The Mavericks notably lost in the finals of the 1947 NAIA Division I men's basketball tournament to Marshall University by a score of 73 to 59.

Minnesota State is currently coached by Matt Margenthaler, the school's all-time winningest men's basketball coach who is a 1991 Western Illinois graduate that has guided the Mavericks to a 330–133 mark for a .713 winning percentage, seven conference championships and 11 NCAA tournament appearances in his 15 years with program.

Women's basketball
The women's basketball team won the 2009 NCAA Division II national championship with a 103–94 win over Franklin Pierce University on March 27, 2009 in San Antonio, Texas.  The combined score of the game (197 points) established a championship tournament record for most points in a game by two teams.

Men's ice hockey

Minnesota State notably competes at the Division I level in both men's and women's hockey. The team plays at the Verizon Wireless Center and practices at the All Seasons Arena.

Prior to 1996, the program competed in the NCAA Division II, during which time they won the 1980 NCAA Division II National Championship by defeating Elmira College 5–2 in the final. The Mavericks earned their first berth in the NCAA Division I Tournament in 2002–03. They lost to eventual East Regional champion Cornell University 5–2 in the opening round.

The hockey program is currently led by head coach Mike Hastings, who was appointed in 2012. His assistants are former MNSU defenseman Darren Blue and Todd Knott. Hastings took the place of Troy Jutting, who was named the WCHA Coach of the Year during the 2007–08 season after finishing 19–16–4 overall. Jutting held the post as head coach since the 2000–01 season after replacing longtime coach Don Brose. The Mavericks commenced play at the Division I level during the 1996–97 season.

Mavericks alumni who have played in the NHL include Ryan Carter (Anaheim/Carolina/Minnesota), Steve Wagner (St. Louis/Pittsburgh), David Backes (St. Louis), Tim Jackman (Columbus/Phoenix/Los Angeles/New York Islanders/Calgary), Grant Stevenson (San Jose) and Jon Kalinski (Philadelphia). Carter became the first former Maverick to have his name engraved into the Stanley Cup, as a member of the 2007 Stanley Cup-winning Anaheim Ducks.

David Backes became the first former Maverick to be selected to the U.S. Olympic Team for men's hockey and won a silver medal during the 2010 Winter Olympics.

Women's ice hockey

Softball 
Minnesota State's softball team is led by longtime head coach Lori Meyer, a member of the National Fastpitch Coaches Hall of Fame who has helmed the Mavericks since 1985. Under Meyer Minnesota State has won one DII national championship (2017), three North Central Conference titles (1987, 1989, 2007) and four Northern Sun Intercollegiate Conference titles (2012, 2013, 2014, 2016), made 13 trips to the NCAA Division II National Tournament (1987, 1989, 1995, 1997, 2007, 2008, 2009, 2010, 2011, 2012, 2013, 2014, 2016) and a pair of trips to the NCAA Championships (1987 and 2011). Minnesota State appeared in one Women's College World Series in 1975.

Track and field
Junior pole vaulter Katelin Rains claimed her second NCAA Division II indoor pole vault championship and was named the USTFCCCA National Field Athlete of the Year. She hails from the same high school as former Maverick and U.S. Olympian David Backes, both attended Spring Lake Park High School in Spring Lake Park, Minnesota.

In 2010, senior Denise Mokaya won the Division II Indoor NCAA National Championship in the 800m, winning in 1:51.41

National championships
The Mavericks have won six team NCAA national championships, all at the College Division/Division II level. Also at the Division II level, the Maverick football team finished as national runner-up in 2014 and 2019 and the Maverick baseball team finished as national runner-up in the 2013 season.

Team

Minnesota Vikings 

Minnesota State University hosted the summer training camp for the Minnesota Vikings from 1966 to 2017, before the team moved camp to the Minneapolis suburb of Eagan, Minnesota.

See also
List of college athletic programs in Minnesota

References

External links